The 1913 Copa del Rey comprised two different competitions held the same year.

Due to disagreements between the Royal Spanish Football Federation and some clubs, in 1913 two parallel competitions were held: an "official", organized by the FEF (Federación Española de Fútbol), in Madrid and an "unofficial", organized by the UECF (Unión Española de Clubes de Fútbol), in Barcelona. Both are currently recognized as official by the RFEF.

Copa FEF (Federación Española de Fútbol)

The competition started on 16 March 1913 and concluded on 23 March 1913 with the replay of the final (FEF), held at the O'Donell, Madrid, in which Racing de Irún lifted the trophy for the first time ever with a 1–0 victory over Athletic Bilbao, with the only goal of the match being scored by Manuel Retegui.

Preliminary round

Semifinals

Final

Replay

Copa UECF (Unión Española de Clubes de Fútbol)

Three teams were going to take part in the tournament, but Pontevedra CF withdrew before the start of the tournament, and due to its absence, it was agreed for a second match to be played between FC Barcelona and Real Sociedad, elucidating the title to a two-legged final. Both legs ended in draws (2–2 and 0–0), thus forcing a play-off in which Barça lifted the trophy with a 2–1, thanks to first-half goals from José Berdié and Apolinario Rodríguez.

First leg

Second leg

Final

References

External links
rsssf.com
 linguasport.com

1913
1913 domestic association football cups
Copa